Ahmed Al-Naqbi (Arabic:أحمد النقبي) (born 3 December 1988) is an Emirati footballer. He currently plays as a midfielder for Dibba.

References

External links
 

Emirati footballers
1988 births
Living people
Khor Fakkan Sports Club players
Dibba FC players
Al Bataeh Club players
UAE First Division League players
UAE Pro League players
Association football midfielders